The Iraqi Women's Football League is the league competition for women's football in Iraq. It is run by the Iraq Football Association and was first played in the 2015–16 season. The current format sees four teams playing six matches each (playing each team in the league twice), totalling 12 matches in the season.

The current champions are Naft Al-Shamal, who won the 2020–21 title by winning all six of their games.

List of champions

See also
 AFC Women's Club Championship
 Women's football in Iraq
 Iraq women's national football team

References

External links
 Iraq Football Association

Iraqi Women's Football League
Iraq
Football leagues in Iraq
Sports leagues established in 2016
2016 establishments in Iraq
Women's sports leagues in Iraq